The BCI CitiRider is an integrally-constructed high capacity low-floor and low-entry single-deck and double-decker bus produced by BCI Bus since 2015. It is produced at BCI Bus' manufacturing facility in Xiamen, China. The double-decker bus is marketed as both the BCI Excellence and BCI Enterprise in the United Kingdom.

Design
The BCI CitiRider single-decker version has a low-entry configuration for its interior whereas the double-decker (twin-axle or tri-axle) version has a full low-floor configuration for its interior.

The Enterprise was launched in the United Kingdom by Ensignbus in July 2016. In the standard, 98-seat specification as ordered by Ensignbus, the Enterprise is fully PSVAR (Public Service Vehicle Accessibility Regulations 2000) compliant, and as such can be used on public bus services as well as private hires.

Operators
Ensignbus, who are also the dealer for the Excellence and Enterprise in the United Kingdom, became the first operator of the type, taking delivery of four examples in August 2016. Aintree Coach Lines took delivery of a single example in August 2016. Ensignbus have confirmed it will be taking delivery of twelve twin-axle Enterprises from December 2016 onwards.

A Hybrid version, with a Vantage Power hybrid system first came to Camberwell Bus Garage and is being trialed at Go-Ahead London, operating as a spare for River Road Garage in East London. 

In New Zealand, Ritchies Transport operates 18 single deckers and 26 double deckers, and Tranurban (Tranzit Group) operates 27 double deckers. In 2021, Tranzurban converted a BCI double decker from diesel to electric power.

References

External links
Citirider 8 BCI Bus
Citirder 12 BCI Bus
Citirider E BCI Bus

Double-decker buses
Low-floor buses
Low-entry buses
Tri-axle buses
Vehicles introduced in 2015